Scottish language may refer to:

 Scots language (Scots Leid), a Germanic language spoken in Lowland Scotland and Ulster, native to southeast Scotland
 Scottish Gaelic (Gàidhlig), a Celtic language native to the Scottish Highlands
 Scottish English, the varieties of English spoken in Scotland
 Scottish Language, a peer-reviewed journal of Scottish languages and linguistics, published by the Association for Scottish Literary Studies

See also 
 Languages of Scotland, the languages spoken or once spoken in Scotland